Famous Studios (renamed Paramount Cartoon Studios in 1956) was the first animation division of the film studio Paramount Pictures from 1942 to 1967. Famous was founded as a successor company to Fleischer Studios, after Paramount seized control of the aforementioned studio after the departure of its founders, Max and Dave Fleischer, in 1942. The studio's productions included three series started by the Fleischers—Popeye the Sailor, Superman, and Screen Songs—as well as Little Audrey, Little Lulu, Casper the Friendly Ghost, Honey Halfwitch, Herman and Katnip, Baby Huey, and the anthology Noveltoons series.

The Famous name was previously used by Famous Players Film Company, one of several companies which in 1912 became Famous Players-Lasky Corporation, the company which founded Paramount Pictures. Paramount's music publishing branch, which held the rights to all of the original music in the Fleischer/Famous cartoons, was named Famous Music, and a movie theater chain in Canada owned by Paramount was called Famous Players.

The library of Famous Studios cartoons is currently divided between three separate film studios (via various subsidiaries): Paramount Pictures (which owns both the pre-October 1950 and post-March 1962 cartoons), Universal Pictures and DreamWorks Animation through DreamWorks Classics aka Classic Media, LLC. (which owns the cartoons made between October 1950 and March 1962 under Harvey Entertainment) and Warner Bros. through Turner Entertainment and DC Comics (which owns the entirety of both the  Superman and Popeye cartoons).

History

Fleischer Studios dissolution 

Fleischer Studios was a successful animation studio responsible for producing cartoon shorts starring characters such as Betty Boop and Popeye the Sailor. The studio moved its operations from New York City to Miami, Florida in 1938, following union problems and the start of production on its first feature film, Gulliver's Travels (1939). While Gulliver was a success, the expense of the move and increased overhead costs created finance problems for the Fleischer Studios. The studio depended upon advances and loans from its distributor, Paramount Pictures, in order to continue production on its short subjects and to begin work on a second feature, Mr. Bug Goes to Town.

Compounding the problems the studio was facing was the fact that the studio's co-founders, brothers Max Fleischer and Dave Fleischer, were becoming increasingly estranged, and by this time were no longer speaking to each other due to personal and professional disputes. On May 25, 1941, Paramount assumed full ownership of Fleischer Studios, and required the Fleischer brothers to submit signed letters of resignation, to be used at Paramount's discretion. Following the unsuccessful release of Mr. Bug in December 1941, Max Fleischer, no longer able to cooperate with Dave, sent Paramount a telegram expressing such. Paramount responded by producing the letters of resignation, severing the Fleischer brothers from control of their studio.

Paramount renamed the studio Famous Studios. Although they had ownership of the company, it remained a separate entity. Three top Fleischer employees were promoted to run the animation studio: business manager Sam Buchwald, storyboard artist Isadore Sparber, and Max Fleischer's son-in-law, head animator Seymour Kneitel. Buchwald assumed Max Fleischer's place as executive producer, while Sparber and Kneitel shared Dave Fleischer's former responsibilities as supervising producers and credited directors. A third animation director, Dan Gordon, remained only briefly before being fired shortly after the move to New York. Although the Fleischers left the studio at the end of 1941, Famous Studios was not officially incorporated until May 25, 1942, after Paramount's contract with Fleischer Studios had formally run its course. The first Famous Studios cartoon was the Popeye cartoon You're a Sap, Mr. Jap, released on August 7, 1942.

Early years 
Shortly after the takeover, Paramount began plans to move a significantly downsized Famous Studios back to New York, a move completed early in 1943. Virtually all of the Famous staff, including voice artist/storyman Jack Mercer, storyman Carl Meyer, voice artist Mae Questel, and animators such as Myron Waldman, David Tendlar, Thomas Johnson, Nicholas Tafuri, and Al Eugster, were holdovers from the Fleischer era. These artists remained with Famous/Paramount for much of the studio's existence. As at Fleischer, the head animators carried out the tasks that were assigned to animation directors at other studios, while the credited directors—Kneitel, Sparber, Gordon, and Disney/Terrytoons veteran Bill Tytla—acted more as supervisors. Sammy Timberg served as musical director until he was succeeded in 1944 by Winston Sharples, who formerly worked with the Van Beuren Studios.

Continuing series from the Fleischer period included Popeye the Sailor and Superman, both licensed from popular comics characters. The expensive Superman cartoons, having lost their novelty value with exhibitors, ended production in 1943, a year after Famous' inception. They were replaced by a series starring Saturday Evening Post comic strip character Little Lulu. Also in 1943, Famous began producing the formerly black-and-white Popeye cartoons in Technicolor, and began a new series of one-shot cartoons under the umbrella title Noveltoons (similar in respects to the Color Classics series from Fleischer Studios, and also the Looney Tunes and Merrie Melodies series from Warner Bros.).

The Noveltoons series introduced several popular characters such as Herman and Katnip, Baby Huey and Casper the Friendly Ghost. Casper was created by writer Seymour Reit and Famous animator Joe Oriolo in the late 1930s as a children's book manuscript, and was sold to Famous during World War II. It became the studio's most successful wholly owned property.

In 1947, Paramount decided to stop paying Little Lulu creator Marge licensing royalties, and created another "mischievous girl" character, Little Audrey, as a replacement. That same year Famous resurrected an old Fleischer series, Screen Songs, introducing a new series of musical cartoons featuring a "bouncing ball" sing-along. In 1951, the Screen Songs became "Kartune Musical Shorts," which ended in 1953 after Max Fleischer claimed ownership of the "bouncing ball" trademark. Only two more musical cartoons were released (as one-shot Noveltoons): 1954's Candy Cabaret and 1963's Hobo's Holiday.

Although the studio still carried much of the staff from the previous regime, animation fans and historians note that its films soon diverged from the previous style. Many of them, including animation historian and film critic Leonard Maltin, derided the company style for being highly formulaic and largely oriented toward a children's audience, with none of the artistic ambition or sophistication that the management under the Fleischer brothers strove for.

Later period and sales of cartoon libraries 
Sam Buchwald died of a heart attack in 1951. Seymour Kneitel and Isadore Sparber became the production heads of the studio shortly afterward, and Dave Tendlar was promoted to director in 1953.

The mid and late-1950s brought a number of significant changes for Famous Studios. In 1955, Paramount sold most of its 1942–1950 shorts and cartoons, except for the Popeye and Superman shorts, to U.M. & M. TV Corporation for television distribution. The Popeye cartoons were acquired by Associated Artists Productions, and the Superman cartoons had already reverted to Superman's owners National Comics after the studio's film rights to the character had expired. On October 1, 1956, Famous Studios was downsized and reorganized. Paramount assumed full control of the studio, integrating it as a division named Paramount Cartoon Studios. Around the same time, Isadore Sparber was fired, leaving Seymour Kneitel alone in charge of the studio. In addition, because of studio budget cuts, the animation quality of the shorts began to drop sharply; by 1959 everything that the studio was turning out began to look bizarrely cheap and limited. Paramount also ceased using Technicolor by this time in favor for cheaper color processes. The last Famous Studios short to use Technicolor was Katnip's Big Day, the finale of the Herman and Katnip cartoon series. Despite the studio submitting some of their shorts for Academy Award consideration, none received a nomination.

Paramount sold its remaining cartoon film library and the rights to its established characters to Harvey Comics in 1959;  however, the final theatrical cartoon to have any of their established characters already acquired by Harvey Comics since was Turtle Scoop featuring Tommy Tortoise and Moe Hare (both uncredited and redrawn) in 1961. Paramount's attempts at creating replacement characters, among them Jeepers and Creepers and The Cat, proved unsuccessful. Nonetheless, television animation production outsourced from King Features and Harvey Films brought the company additional income. Ironically, these arrangements had Paramount working on new television cartoons starring Casper, whom they had originally created, and Popeye and Little Lulu, characters they had previously licensed for theatrical cartoons. In the case of King Features' Popeye and King Features Trilogy TV cartoons, Paramount was one of several animation studios, among them Jack Kinney Productions and Rembrandt Films, to which King Features subcontracted production. The first of only two all-new Little Lulu cartoons after the character's 13-year hiatus off-screen, Alvin's Solo Flight, was released as part of the Noveltoons series in 1961, while twelve of the King Features Trilogy cartoons, starring characters such as Krazy Kat, Little Lulu, Beetle Bailey, and Snuffy Smith, were released theatrically by Paramount in 1962 under the title Comic Kings.

Seymour Kneitel died of a heart attack in 1964, and Paramount brought in comic book veteran Howard Post to run the cartoon studio. Under Post's supervision, Paramount began new cartoon series and characters such as Swifty and Shorty and Honey Halfwitch (the latter having originated from the Modern Madcaps series in the 1965 short Poor Little Witch Girl), and allowed comic strip artist Jack Mendelsohn to direct two well-received cartoons based upon children's imaginations and drawing styles: The Story of George Washington and A Leak in the Dike (both 1965).

However, Post left the studio due to internal conflicts with the Paramount staff. His replacement was Shamus Culhane, a veteran of the Fleischer Studios. Culhane completed a few films that Post started and then ignored the rule book and made films that were very different from the previous regime. In 1966, the studio subcontracted The Mighty Thor cartoons from Grantray-Lawrence Animation, producers of the animated television series The Marvel Super Heroes. In 1967, Culhane directed another short based upon children's art, My Daddy, the Astronaut, which became Paramount's first film to be shown at an animation festival. However, when Paramount's board of directors rejected a proposal to produce episodes for a second Grantray-Lawrence series, Spider-Man, Culhane quit the studio, and was succeeded by former Terrytoons animator Ralph Bakshi in mid-1967. Although Bakshi quickly put several experimental shorts into production, by the winter of 1968, Paramount's new owners, Gulf+Western, had begun the process of shutting down the animation studio, a task completed in December. The last cartoon from Paramount Cartoon Studios, Mouse Trek, the finale of the Fractured Fables series, premiered on December 31, 1967.

Legacy 
Despite the reputation of the studio in recent years, their shorts have since gained a cult following on both public domain home media and in animation circles.

The 1961 short Abner the Baseball is displayed at the Baseball Hall of Fame.

Ownership and licensing 
Throughout the 1950s, most of the major Hollywood studios, severely underestimating the value of their back-catalog, sold off their film libraries to various television companies. In the case of Paramount, throughout the decade, they sold off the Famous Studios library to various different TV syndication companies resulting in multiple studios owning different cartoons.

In January 1956, Paramount sold the Pre-October 1950 Fleischer and Famous Studios cartoons (excluding Popeye and Superman) to U.M. & M. TV Corporation for $3 million. In 1957, U.M & M was bought out by National Telefilm Associates (NTA). In the 1980s, NTA changed its name to Republic Pictures. After a brief period of ownership by Spelling Entertainment in 1994, Republic Pictures was purchased by Paramount's parent company Viacom in 1996, placing the shorts back in Paramount's control (Republic Pictures was renamed Melange Pictures LLC. in 2013). Due to poor attention to then-required copyright renewals over the decades, many of these cartoons are now in the public domain.

In June of that same year, Paramount sold the entirety of the Fleischer/Famous Studios Popeye cartoons from 1933 to 1957 to Associated Artists Productions (who had also recetnly purchased much of the Warner Bros. back catalog) for $1.25 million. The assets of A.A.P were in turn purchased by United Artists in 1958. In 1981, United Artists merged with Metro-Goldwyn-Mayer to form MGM/UA. In 1986, Ted Turner's Turner Broadcasting System attempted to acquire MGM/UA, but due to debt concerns, Turner was forced to sell the company back to its original owners. However, Turner kept most of the pre-1986 MGM library as well as few portions of the United Artists library, including the a.a.p. library, and formed his own holding company Turner Entertainment to manage the rights. In 1996, Turner Broadcasting merged with Time Warner. Since then, Warner Bros. controls the rights to Popeye cartoons via its Turner Entertainment division. 

As per their original contract, the rights to the Superman cartoons reverted to National Comics after Paramount's deal expired in 1947. While the cartoons themselves are now in the public domain after their original copyrights were not renewed, the ancillary rights are still owned by DC Comics and are distributed by Warner Bros who has owned DC since 1969.

In July 1958, Paramount sold off the Famous Studios cartoons made between October-1950 to March-1962, as well as the rights to all original characters created by Famous Studios (Casper, Baby Huey, Herman and Katnip, Little Audrey, etc.) to Harvey Comics for $1.7 million. who created Harvey Entertainment to handle the rights and rebranded the cartoons as Harveytoons. In 2001, Harvey Comics was purchased by the holding company Classic Media. In 2012, Classic Media was purchased by DreamWorks Animation (and briefly renamed the company DreamWorks Classics) who now retains ownership of the cartoons. In 2016, DreamWorks Animation was purchased by Comcast's NBCUniversal, with Universal Pictures assuming the distribution of the cartoons on behalf of DreamWorks.

Paramount continues to own the rights to the cartoons made after March 1962.

Home media 
As of 2021, there has been no official release of the Paramount-owned Famous Studios library. Many of the cartoons are in the public domain and widely available (albeit usually in poor quality) in several low budget DVDs and Blu-Rays sold in supermarkets and department stores. In 2012, Thunderbean Animation restored and released a collection of public domain Noveltoons on DVD entitled Noveltoons Original Classics.

In 2008, Warner Home Video released Popeye the Sailor: 1941–1943, Volume 3, the third volume of a series of Popeye DVDs. It contained all the black & white Famous Studios Popeye cartoons alongside the last of the Fleischer shorts. In 2018, Warner Archive released Popeye the Sailor: The 1940s, Volume 1 which continued where the previous set left off and contained the first 14 Technicolor Famous Studio cartoons from 1943 to 1945. Warner Archive continued the collection with Popeye the Sailor: The 1940s, Volume 2 and Popeye the Sailor: The 1940s, Volume 3 officially collecting all the Popeye cartoons from the 1940s. The remaining Famous Studios Popeye cartoons from the 1950s have yet to be released.

During the 1990s, Harvey Entertainment produced, The Harveytoons Show that collected most of the Harvey owned Famous cartoons, first aired in syndication with the series being consulted by animation historian Jerry Beck. In 2006, Classic Media released 52 of the show's 78 episodes on a four-disc DVD set titled Harvey Toons – The Complete Collection. In 2011, Vivendi Entertainment and Classic Media released all Herman and Katnip cartoons on a single disc DVD set titled Herman and Katnip: The Complete Collection. Also in 2011, Shout! Factory under licence from Classic Media released 61 of 78 Casper cartoons from The Harveytoons Show on a three-disc DVD set titled Casper the Friendly Ghost: The Complete Collection. On November 2, 2021, Universal Pictures Home Entertainment released all of the Harvey-owned Famous Studios cartoons on a 3-disc DVD boxset titled The Best of the Harveytoons Show.

Filmography

Theatrical short subjects series 
 Popeye the Sailor (1942–1957; inherited from Fleischer Studios)
 Superman (1942–1943; inherited from Fleischer Studios)
 Noveltoons (1943–1967)
 Little Lulu (1943–1948, 1961–1962)
 Screen Songs (1947–1951; originally produced by Fleischer Studios)
 Little Audrey (1947–1958)
 Baby Huey (1950–1959)
 Casper the Friendly Ghost (1950–1959)
 Herman and Katnip (1950–1959)
 Kartunes (1951–1953)
 Tommy Tortoise and Moe Hare (1953–1957)
 Modern Madcaps (1958–1967)
 Jeepers and Creepers (1960; part of the Modern Madcap series)
 The Cat (1960–1961; part of the Modern Madcap series)
 Abner the Baseball (1961; two-reeler special)
 Comic Kings (1962–1963)
 Swifty and Shorty (1964–1965)
 Honey Halfwitch (1965–1967)
 Nudnik (1965–1967) (produced by Gene Deitch in Czechoslovakia)
 Merry Makers (1967)
 GoGo Toons (1967)
 Fractured Fables (1967)

Television series 
 Segments of Felix the Cat (1958–1962; outsourced from Joe Oriolo Productions and Trans-Lux)
 Matty's Funday Funnies (1959–1962 episodes only)
 Segments of Popeye the Sailor (1960–1962; outsourced from King Features)
 Segments of King Features Trilogy (1961–1965; outsourced from King Features)
 Twelve of the Paramount-produced shorts in this series were released theatrically in 1962 under the title Comic Kings.
 The New Casper Cartoon Show (1963–1964, produced for Harvey Films)
 The Mighty Thor segments of The Marvel Super Heroes (1966; outsourced from Grantray-Lawrence Animation)

Industrial shorts 
 Electronics At Work (1943)
 It's CSP for Me (1950)

See also 
 Fleischer Studios
 Harvey Films
 Terrytoons
 Paramount Animation
 Public domain animation in the US

References

External links 
 
 Paramount and Famous Studios at Cartoon Research 
 Famous Studio filmography 1940s
 Famous Studio filmography 1950s
 Famous Studio filmography 1960s

 
American companies established in 1942
American companies disestablished in 1967
American animation studios
Defunct companies based in Florida
Paramount Pictures
Mass media companies established in 1942
Mass media companies disestablished in 1967
Companies based in New York (state)
Defunct companies based in New York (state)
1942 establishments in Florida
1967 disestablishments in New York (state)
Companies based in Miami